Monal Gajjar (born 13 May) is an Indian actress and model who mainly appears in Telugu and Gujarati films. She debuted with 2012 Telugu film Sudigadu. She has also acted in Satish Kaushik directed Hindi film Kaagaz in 2021 which is a satire on governmental system in Bharat.

Life and career
Gajjar was born on 13 May in a Gujarati family and hails from Ahmedabad in Gujarat. While graduating in commerce, she started working in ING Vysya Bank. At the suggestion of her yoga teacher, Gajjar participated at the Mirchi Queen Bee beauty pageant contest organised by Radio Mirchi in 2011, which she went on to win. She later won the Miss Gujarat title as well.

Even before the release of her first film, Gajjar signed five films, including a film in Tamil and Telugu. She made début in Malayalam with Dracula 2012. She has done a special appearance in Asha Bhonsle's film. Her first two Tamil films Vanavarayan Vallavarayan and Sigaram Thodu released on the same day.

Gajjar received good reviews for her performance in Sigaram Thodu. IndiaGlitz.com review says - Monal looking clean and sweet in looks and acting wise. Gajjar also received good reviews for Vanavarayan Vallavarayan. Behindwoods.com review said - The tall Monal Gajjar looks totally gorgeous with sparkling eyes, and has all that it takes to be the next big glam sensation in Tamil Nadu. Though her role loses scope in the second half, she performs capably and also gets the lip-sync right.

In September 2020, Gajjar entered the Telugu reality TV show Bigg Boss 4 as one of the first contestants. She was evicted in December, before the final week.

Filmography

Films

Television

Web series

References

External links
 
 

Living people
Gujarati people
Actresses from Ahmedabad
Actresses in Gujarati cinema
Actresses in Hindi cinema
Actresses in Tamil cinema
Actresses in Telugu cinema
Actresses in Malayalam cinema
Indian film actresses
21st-century Indian actresses
Bigg Boss (Telugu TV series) contestants
Year of birth missing (living people)